Geoff Palmer (Geoffrey Palmer born January 17, 1980, in Wakefield, Massachusetts, United States), also known by the stage name Geoff Useless, is an American musician from Portsmouth, New Hampshire, now living in Madison, Wisconsin. He played bass and provided backing vocals for The Queers straight out of high school, and played guitar and did lead vocals for The Guts and The Nobodys.

In early 2011, he did a folk punk solo project with other musicians around Portsmouth called The Geoff Useless (Band). Currently, he co-writes songs for, and plays lead guitar in, a traditional rock and roll /powerpop band called The Connection. The Connection's debut album New England's Newest Hit Makers was released in the Summer of 2011. It, and subsequent releases, captured the attention of Steve Van Zandt, E Street Band member and creator of the popular Sirius XM Radio Station, Little Steven's Underground Garage. Over about a one-year period, Van Zandt went on to name four Connection songs "Coolest Song in the World," putting each in heavy rotation to give the band continual nationwide exposure. Geoff signed with Stardumb Records, on August 13, 2018.

In 2022 Geoff Palmer added a twist to the Ramones tribute series by covering the infamous 1989 Dee Dee King rap album Standing in the Spotlight. Released on Dee Dee's birthday from Stardumb Records.

Dee Dee's wife, Vera Ramone, who the song Baby Doll is written for, provided a quote for the LP's hype sticker:

"This tribute album to the late and great DEE DEE RAMONE/KING by GEOFF PALMER is just as fun and entertaining as the original from 1989. Geoff and his bandmates have done a fantastic rendition of "Standing in the Spotlight" with a fresh and updated spin. I'm sure Dee Dee would feel honored and proud by this kind gesture, just as I am. Many thanks from both of us! - Vera Ramone King (a/k/a Baby Doll)."

Biography
Palmer was born in 1980 in Wakefield, Massachusetts, and as a teenager became the bassist for the Portsmouth, New Hampshire punk rock band The Queers. He played on the band's 1998 release's Everything's OK and Punk Rock Confidential. Following his departure from The Queers, he was the guitarist/singer for The Nobodys, and then his longtime band The Guts.

The Guts were formed by Palmer, along with bassist Nate Doyle and drummer Rick Orcutt, when they were students at Portsmouth High School. Originally known as She's a Guy, they changed the band's name to The Guts.

They released their first album Sensitive side of The Guts in 2001. In 2003 they put out their second full length Say Goodbye to Fun and the EP So What If We're On DBD? After going on a hiatus, the band reformed in 2006, and did a worldwide tour, with stops in America, Canada, and Europe, adding Courtney Denison, of The Lanterns, as their second guitarist for the European dates. That year they re-released all their old material in a compilation called Sometimes You Just Can't Win, and put out a new EP called Mucho Punk Rock N' Roll.

In 2007, the band played Insubordination Fest, where in addition to doing a set of their own, did sets backing up Screeching Weasel singer Ben Weasel, and former Queers singer Wimpy Rutherford. CD/DVD sets from the show, of The Guts, and Wimpy Rutherford with The Guts, were released on Insubordination Records in 2008. That year they would also release what would be their last full-length album, Let it Go, which was recorded at Butch Vig's Smart Studios.

In 2009, Geoff Useless was arrested on suspicion of heroin possession, and again for failing to appear in court. The band broke up shortly after this.

Geoff Palmer released his first solo album Don't Stop. in 2010.

Palmer started The Connection in 2011 with Brad Marino. The band has toured Europe twice and has gained an avid following in the Power Pop musical genre, playing shows with The Flamin' Groovies, Mark Lindsay, Richie Ramone, The Figgs, Muck and The Mires, the legendary Paul Collins (musician) of The Nerves and The Paul Collins Beat. The Connection's song "Seven Nights to Rock" was picked by Steven Van Zandt and his SiriusXM radio show "Little Steven's Underground Garage" as the "Coolest Song in The World" for the week of August 12, 2012. The band went on to receive "Coolest Song" honors and saturation airplay three more times over the next year with the original Marino/Palmer compositions "Comes 'n' Goes," 4/7/13, "Crawling From The Wreckage of A Saturday Night," 7/8/13, and "Girls In This Town," 9/1/13.

In early 2014, the Rock and Roll Hall of Fame and Museum selected The Connection to perform at its 11th annual "It's Only Rock and Roll" Spring Benefit to "an exclusive audience of 1,000 Rock and Roll Hall of Fame VIPS." The event will take place at Cleveland's Public Hall (Auditorium), the same venue at which the Rock and Roll Hall of Fame Induction ceremony sometimes is held. Daryl Hall and John Oates are slated to perform later in the evening. Proceeds from the May 10, 2014, event go to the Rock and Roll Hall of Fame and Museum's music education activities.

In 2012 Palmer founded Collector's Club Records with fellow New England musician Kurt Baker. The label has released albums and singles by The Connection, Baker, and Wimpy and The Medallions, which features the original vocalist for The Queers Wimpy Rutherford.

In November 2013, Brad Marino, Geoff Palmer (The Connection) and Kurt Baker recorded a two-track CD as The New Trocaderos. On March 3, 2014, the New Trocaderos track "The Kids" was named a "Coolest Song In The World" on SiriusXM radio show "Little Steven's Underground Garage". In September 2014, the trio recorded a second New Trocaderos EP entitled "Kick Your Ass." On January 4, 2015, the song "Dream Girl" was named a "Coolest Song In The World." This was the thirteenth time (including four Kurt Baker "Coolest Songs" and one Kris Rodgers "Coolest Song") that a song featuring Palmer went on to receive "Coolest Song" honors.

On August 13, 2018, Geoff signed with Stardumb Records.

Discography
The QueersEverything's OK – The Queers (1998) Hopeless RecordsPunk Rock Confidential – The Queers (1998) Hopeless Records
"Split 7inch with The Adam Age" (2009) Asian Man Records

The NobodysI've Been Everywhere – The Nobodys (2000) Suburban Home Records

JJ Nobody and The Regulars
"Rock 'n' Roll Doesn't End At 2:00" (2001) Hopeless Records

The Drunken CholosLivin La Vida Loca – The Drunken Cholos (2001) Doheny Records

The GutsO.F.S.C. (Single) (2023)Sensitive side of The Guts (LP) (2001)Say Goodbye to Fun (LP) (2003)So What If We're On DBD? (EP) (2003)Sometimes You Just Can't Win (Compilation) (2006)Mucho Punk Rock N' Roll (EP) (2006)Stickin' With It (split w/ The Prozacs) (EP) (2007)Let it Go (LP) (2008)Insubordination Fest 2007 (Live) (2008)Insubordination Fest 2007 (w/ Wimpy Rutherford) (Live) (2008)A Safe Return to the Forest (split w/ The Jizz Kids) (EP) (2009)Songs Of Freedom (LP) (2012)

SoloTell Me What – EP – Geoff Useless (2009) Livid RecordsDon't Stop – Geoff Useless / Geoff Palmer (2010) Livid RecordsThis One's Gonna Be Hot – Vinyl EP – Geoff Palmer (2019) Vinyl (Stardumb Records)Many More Drugs – Vinyl EP – Geoff Palmer (2019) Vinyl (Stardumb Records)Pulling Out All The Stops LP – Geoff Palmer (2019) Vinyl (Stardumb Records)/ CD (Rum Bar)Charts & Graphs LP – Geoff Palmer (2021) Vinyl (Stardumb Records)/ CD (Rum Bar)Standing in the Spotlight LP – Geoff Palmer (2022) Vinyl / CD (Stardumb Records)

Geoff Palmer & Lucy EllisIn Spite of Ourselves single – Geoff Palmer & Lucy Ellis (2020)"Your Face is Weird" - album – Geoff Palmer & Lucy Ellis (2020) vinyl Stardumb / CD Rum Bar

The ConnectionStop Talking EP – The Connection (2011) Fun With Asbestos RecordsNew England's Newest Hit Makers – The Connection (2011) Collector's Club RecordsSeven Nights To Rock EP  – The Connection (2012) Collector's Club Recordssplit with The Cry – The Connection (2013) Mooster Records
 "The Connection" – The Connection (2013) King Yum Records
 "Crawling from the Wreckage of a Saturday Night" – The Connection Collector's Club Records
 "Let It Rock" – The Connection (2013) King Yum Records
 "Wish You Success" – The Connection (2018) 
 "Just For Fun" – The Connection (2016) 
 "Labor of Love" – The Connection (2015) 
 "A Christmas Gift For" – The Connection (2014)

Kurt Baker
"After Party" – Kurt Baker CD/LP (2020) (Wicked Cool Records)Rocking for a Living – Kurt Baker (2011)Want You Around – Kurt Baker (2012) Jolly Ronnie RecordsBrand New Beat – Kurt Baker (2012) Collector's Club Records
"Girls Got Money / Yeah? Yeah!" 45 – Kurt Baker (2013) Collector's Club Records
"Dance With Me Tonight / I Don't Wanna Get Involved" 45 Kurt Baker (2011) Torreznetes EntertainmentPlay it Cool – Kurt Baker (2015)The Lost Weekend EP – Kurt Baker (2017)

KEWPIDTUNNEL OF LOVE b/w STAR CROSSED EP – (cas)single (2021) Memorable But Not Honorable Tapes

Wimpy and The MedallionsStill Headed Nowhere – Wimpy and The Medallions (2013) Collector's Club Records

The New Trocaderos

"Money Talks / The Kids" (2013)Kick Your Ass EP (2014)Frenzy in the Hips EP (2015)Thrills & Chills'' LP (2015)

References

External links
Livid Records
Wire NH article on Geoff Useless
Geoff Useless @ Bandcamp
Geoff Useless @ Interpunk.com
The Guts @ Interpunk.com
The Connection's Website

American male singer-songwriters
American folk singers
1980 births
People from Portsmouth, New Hampshire
Living people
The Queers members
21st-century American singers
21st-century American male singers
Singer-songwriters from New Hampshire
20th-century American singers
20th-century American male singers
People from Wakefield, Massachusetts
Singer-songwriters from Massachusetts